The Wigan Urban Area is an area of land defined by the Office for National Statistics consisting of the built-up, or 'urbanised' area containing Wigan in Greater Manchester and Skelmersdale in West Lancashire.

The Urban Area includes the integrated conurbation around Wigan, (containing the contiguous areas of Ince-in-Makerfield and Wigan itself), along with the outlying areas of Standish, Abram and the West Lancashire town of Skelmersdale.

The Wigan Urban Area has a total population of 175,405. This is an increase of 5% on the 2001 figure of 166,840.

Constituent parts

The historic town of Wigan forms an integrated conurbation along with the Metropolitan Borough of Wigan district of Ince-in-Makerfield, this is connected by ribbon development to Standish, Platt Bridge and Abram. These areas, together with Skelmersdale in West Lancashire, are defined by the Office for National Statistics as the Wigan Urban Area.

Breakdown

The ONS figures were broken down into constituent parts, and an individual population figure given for each. These were:

Notes
 Orrell is included under the Wigan subdivision in the 2011 census data.
 The Abram subdivision was renamed Platt Bridge in the 2011 census.
 The Worthington subdivision was part of the Standish subdivision in the 2001 census.

References

Office for National Statistics: Census 2001, Key Statistics for urban areas
Errata

Urban areas of England
Geography of the Metropolitan Borough of Wigan
Geography of Lancashire